Blue Soul is an album by the American musician Joe Louis Walker, released in 1989. Walker supported the album with a North American tour, backed by the Boss Talkers.

Blue Soul was nominated for a Bammy Award, in the "Outstanding Blues Album" category.

Production
The album was produced by Walker; he also wrote the horn arrangements. It incorporated hard blues, gospel, and folk blues sounds. "Personal Baby" is about the virtues of fidelity in a relationship. David Hidalgo played accordion on "Ain't Nothin' Goin' On". "I'll Get to Heaven on My Own" is performed with just Walker's voice and slide guitar. "Prove Your Love" is a soul song with overdubbed vocals.

Critical reception

Robert Christgau deemed the "unsoullike, unaccompanied" "I'll Get to Heaven on My Own" the album's "standout" song. The New York Times wrote that Walker's voice "is weather-beaten but ready for more; his guitar solos are fast, wiry and incisive, often starting out with impetuous squiggles before moaning with bluesy despair." The Fayetteville Observer warned that "Walker nears Las Vegas-style schmaltz on a couple of early tracks."

The Province noted that Walker "applies his light-fingered, spare guitar style to a variety of blues-styling, including soul and gospel." The Chicago Tribune stated that Walker has "a contemporary style heavily influenced by B.B. King and the Stax sound, an impressive ability on guitar and an appealing vocal style marked a strangely velvety cragginess."

AllMusic praised the "vicious guitar from one of the hottest relatively young bluesmen on the circuit."

Track listing

References

1989 albums
HighTone Records albums